Stygobromus flagellatus, commonly called Ezell's Cave amphipod, is a troglomorphic species of amphipod in family Crangonyctidae. It is endemic to Texas in the United States.

See also
 Edwards Aquifer - where it lives, only in one pool of Ezell's Cave.

References

Freshwater crustaceans of North America
Crustaceans described in 1896
Cave crustaceans
flagellatus
Endemic fauna of Texas